Malacologica Bohemoslovaca is a peer-reviewed open access scientific journal covering all aspects of malacology. It was published by the Slovak Academy of Sciences since 2005. It is published by the Department of Botany and Zoology, Faculty of Science, Masaryk University since 2021. The editor-in-chief is Lucie Juřičková (Charles University in Prague). Articles are published in Czech, Slovak or English, with an abstract in English. The journal is abstracted and indexed in The Zoological Record.

References

External links 

 

Malacology journals
Multilingual journals
Publications established in 2002
Creative Commons Attribution-licensed journals
Academic journals published by learned and professional societies
Academic journals published by universities and colleges